Bracewell may refer to:

People
 Brendon Bracewell (born 1959), New Zealand cricketer, brother of John and Douglas
 Doug Bracewell (born 1990), New Zealand cricketer, son of Brendon
 Douglas Bracewell (born 1953), New Zealand cricketer, brother of John and Brendon
 John Bracewell (born 1958), New Zealand cricketer and coach, brother of Brendon and Douglas
 Joyanne Bracewell (born 1934), British High Court judge
 Mark Bracewell (born 1955), New Zealand cricketer, father of Michael
 Melanie Bracewell (born 1995), New Zealand comedian
 Michael Bracewell (cricketer) (born 1991), New Zealand cricketer, son of Mark
 Michael Bracewell (writer) (born 1958), British writer and novelist
 Nina Bracewell-Smith (born 1955), born Nina Kakkar, Indian-British non-executive director of Arsenal F.C.
 Paul Bracewell (born 1962), England international footballer
 Richard Bracewell (born 1969), English film director
 Ronald N. Bracewell (1921–2007), Australian professor of electrical engineering at Stanford University
 J. Searcy Bracewell Jr. (1918–2003), Texan politician, founder of the law firm Bracewell LLP

Places
 Bracewell, Lancashire, England
 Bracewell, Queensland, a locality in the Gladstone Region, Australia

Other uses
 Bracewell LLP, international law firm based in Houston, Texas